George Brainard Crist (born January 23, 1931) is a retired four-star general of the United States Marine Corps and was the first Marine to be designated as a Unified Commander — serving as Commander in Chief, United States Central Command from 1985 to 1988

Biography
George B. Crist was born on January 23, 1931, in Hartford, Connecticut. His father was a career Navy officer.

Crist graduated cum laude from Villanova University in 1952, where he was in the NROTC.   Later, he received an honorary doctorate from Villanova; and he was honored with Villanova's Alumni Medallion in 1981.

Marine Corps career
Crist was commissioned a second lieutenant in the U.S. Marine Corps in 1952.  While a lieutenant, he served in all three active duty Marine divisions.  During the Korean War, he served with the 1st Marine Division in Korea.

He returned to the United States in 1955, was promoted to captain and ordered to Marine Barracks, Washington, D.C., where he served as a White House aide under President Eisenhower.  In 1959, he graduated from the Advanced Infantry Officers' School, Fort Benning, Georgia, and joined the newly formed U.S. Naval Mission to the Republic of Haiti.

By 1963, Crist had returned to the 2nd Marine Division, where he deployed with an infantry battalion to the Caribbean during the 1962 Cuban Missile Crisis. Later, as Assistant Division G-3, he completed airborne training at Fort Benning.

His first tour in Vietnam came in 1965. As an advisor to the Vietnamese Joint General Staff, he participated in combat operations throughout the Republic of Vietnam.

In 1966, he became aide-de-camp to the Chairman of the Joint Chiefs of Staff. While in that assignment he was promoted to lieutenant colonel.

Following his graduation from the Armed Forces Staff College in 1968, he commanded the 2nd Battalion, 6th Marines at Camp Lejeune, North Carolina. In 1971, he completed the Air War College as a distinguished graduate, concurrently receiving a master's degree in Political Science from Auburn University. The next year, he returned to the Far East, serving first as a battalion commander in the 3rd Marine Division and then with the 9th Marine Amphibious Brigade, assisting in the defense of South Vietnam during the 1972 North Vietnamese Easter Offensive.

When he returned to the U.S, he spent three years at Headquarters Marine Corps in Plans and Programs. While in Washington, he was promoted to colonel.

In the summer of 1975, Crist was ordered to Headquarters, Fleet Marine Force (FMF), Atlantic, Norfolk, Virginia, where he served as Assistant Chief of Staff, G-3, Chief of Staff, and following his promotion to brigadier general, as Deputy Commander.

In 1978, he was transferred to Europe as the Deputy Director of Operations (J-3), U.S. European Command, where he was actively involved in a series of crisis actions ranging from Iran to Africa.

In 1980, Crist was promoted to major general and returned to the United States as the Deputy Chief of Staff for Reserve Affairs. This was followed two years later by a tour with the Joint Chiefs of Staff as the Vice Director, Joint Staff. On Oct. 23, 1983, during a weekend of international crises at the White House, Crist was secretly dispatched from Washington to assist six Caribbean states organize a 300-man Caribbean Peace Force to support the surprise, U.S.-led invasion of Grenada on Oct. 25. For the next five days, Crist served as the on-scene military liaison between the regional peacekeepers and the White House, the Pentagon, the State Department and the CIA. After his return to Washington, Crist on Nov. 2 testified before a Congressional subcommittee on the weapons that were captured from Cubans and Grenadians by American troops in the course of the eight days of hostilities.

In 1984, he was promoted to the rank of lieutenant general and served as the Deputy Chief of Staff for Installations and Logistics and Quartermaster General and then as Chief of Staff, Headquarters Marine Corps.

Crist was promoted to the grade of general in November 1985—the first active-duty Marine to achieve that rank without serving as Commandant or Assistant Commandant of the Corps—and on November 27, 1985, he assumed command of the U.S. Central Command (CENTCOM), MacDill Air Force Base, Florida.  At CENTCOM, he helped to run Operation Earnest Will, the escort of reflagged Kuwaiti tankers; Operation Prime Chance, the secret actions against Iranian naval forces; and Operation Praying Mantis, the April 18, 1988, retaliation for the Iranian mining of the USS Samuel B. Roberts.

General Crist retired from active duty in December 1988 after more than 36 years of service. Following retirement, he became a military consultant for CBS news in 1990, appearing on national television and radio throughout the Gulf War and during subsequent crises in Africa and the Middle East.

The general and his wife Barbara moved to Beaufort, South Carolina, in 1990 after they restored an old house in the Historic District

He has earned a BA, cum laude, from Villanova University, an MS in Political Science from Auburn University, and was awarded an honorary Doctor of Military Science by Villanova University.

His military decorations include two awards of the Defense Distinguished Service Medal, the Defense Superior Service Medal, the Legion of Merit, the Bronze Star Medal, two individual awards of the Air Medal, and the Joint Service Commendation Medal. Foreign decorations include the Egyptian Meritorious Badge of Honor of the First Degree, the Vietnamese Cross of Gallantry with silver and bronze stars, and the Vietnamese Honor Medal.

General Crist is married to Barbara Clay and they have two sons, William and David.

Awards and decorations
His military decorations include:

See also

List of United States Marine Corps four-star generals

Notes

References

External links

1931 births
Living people
United States Marine Corps personnel of the Korean War
United States Marine Corps personnel of the Vietnam War
Auburn University alumni
Recipients of the Legion of Merit
Recipients of the Gallantry Cross (Vietnam)
United States Marine Corps generals
Villanova University alumni
Recipients of the Air Medal
Recipients of the Defense Superior Service Medal
Recipients of the Defense Distinguished Service Medal
Military personnel from Hartford, Connecticut